Plaine-Haute (Gallo: Plenautt) is a commune in the Côtes-d'Armor department of Brittany in northwestern France. It has economic links to nearby Dinard.

Population

Inhabitants of Plaine-Haute are called plénaltais in French.

See also
Communes of the Côtes-d'Armor department

References

External links

Communes of Côtes-d'Armor